The Reka dialect (Rekanski dijalekt) is a member of the west and north-west subgroup of the western group of dialects of Macedonian. The dialect is mainly spoken on the territory of the region Reka in the north-western part of North Macedonia. The Reka dialect is very close with the Galičnik and the Debar dialects. This dialect contains a lot of archaic words.

Phonological characteristics

High frequency of the consonant f (ф)
Low frequency of the consonant dž (џ), replacing it with ž (ж) or žd (жд)
Use of o instead of a

Morphological characteristics

The end of the verbs from the a group are frequently pronounced as verbs from the e group (играат > играет)
Use of the three articles
Use of the suffix -т for the third person singular
Use of the preposition во/в

Notes

Dialects of the Macedonian language